Brasília–President Juscelino Kubitschek International Airport  is the only international airport serving Brasília. The airport was named after Juscelino Kubitschek (1902–1976), the 21st President of Brazil. It is located in the administrative region of Lago Sul, in the Federal District, and is operated by Inframerica. Some of its facilities are shared with the Brasília Air Force Base of the Brazilian Air Force.

History
Brasília was only a project when in 1956 President Juscelino Kubitschek landed for the first time in the Central Plateau. Vera Cruz Airport, built in 1955 by the then Deputy-Governor of Goiás, Bernardo Sayão, at the request of the chairman of the location of the New Federal Capital, Marechal José Pessoa, already existed. On 2 October 1955, the airport received the first crew of workers that would build the new capital. This facility was located where today is the Integrated Bus and Train Terminal of Brasília. This facility, however, was only temporary. The relocation to a definitive site had already been identified as a priority and construction works started on 6 November 1956. The passenger terminal was built of wood. On 2 April 1957, the presidential aircraft landed for the first time at the site and the official inauguration took place on 3 May 1957. That year, on the same location the Brasília Air Force Base was also commissioned.

In 1965 Oscar Niemeyer proposed a visionary project for Brasília Airport to replace the wooden terminal, circular, with similarity outside pillars of Alvorada Palace and subway tunnels to satelite Apron. However, he lost the concession and due to the 1964 Brazilian coup d'état, the military-government chose to build the project of Tércio Fontana Pacheco, an architect of the Brazilian Air Force Ministry. The airport is thus one of the few important buildings in Brasília that is not related to Niemeyer. This building was opened in 1971.

In 1990 Brasília International Airport underwent its first major renovation and began to gain its present form with a central body and two satellites initially planned, but only one concluded, the west wing. Since 1990 it has been under renovation and expansions, constructed by Camargo Côrrea, following an architectural concept of the architect Sérgio Roberto Parada, with conclusion between 2000 until 2004. The first phase included the construction of an access-viaduct to the passenger terminal and metal cover inaugurated in 1992 and the first circular satellite, inaugurated in 1994, in which its form resembles an ovni disc. In the second phase, the main body of the passenger terminal was refitted to include a shopping-mall and the satellite received nine jetways. In 2005, a second runway was opened.

The former terminal for general aviation originally built in 1988 was again reviewed and transformed into Passenger Terminal 2. It was opened for traffic on 2 August 2010.

On 31 August 2009, Infraero unveiled a BRL514.8 million (US$306.06 million; EUR224.76 million) investment plan to renovate President Juscelino Kubitschek International Airport, focusing on the preparations for the 2014 FIFA World Cup, Brasília being one of the venue cities, and the Summer Olympics in 2016 which were held in Rio de Janeiro, Brazil:
 Enlargement of apron and taxiways (BRL 34.5 million). Completed in April 2013
 Renovation of the existing passenger terminal (BRL 22.5 million). Completed in November 2015
 Enlargement of the passenger terminal (BRL 439 million). Completed in April 2015
 Parking (BRL 18 million). Completed in April 2014

Following a decision made on 26 April 2011 by the Federal Government for private companies being granted concessions to operate some Infraero airports, on 6 February 2012, the administration of the airport was granted for 25 years to the Consortium Inframérica, formed by the Brazilian Engineering Group Engevix (50 %) and the Argentinean Group Corporación América (50 %). Inframérica also won the concession of Gov. Aluízio Alves International Airport in Natal. Infraero, the state-run organization, retains 49% of the shares of the company incorporated for the administration. The Brazilian Integrated Air Traffic Control and Air Defense Center section 1 (Cindacta I) is located in the vicinity of the airport.

Between 2012 and 2014, the consortium INFRAMERICA invested R$ 1.2 billion: remodeling the terminal, increasing from 13 to 29 jetways and 40 to 70 airplane positions. In April 2014 the South Concourse, which serves domestic flights, was opened. Until April 2014, the terminal was capable of handling 9 million passengers per year, but actually handled around 14 million. With numbers constantly increasing until 2015, with a decline afterwards.

For 2016 until 2022, there were planned investments for the international area, new parking construction, four new hotels in the vicinity, a new business area and other facilities, like a Shopping Mall, but none was realized until middle 2022.

Airlines and destinations

Passenger

Cargo

Statistics

Annual Passenger Traffic

Busiest international routes (2019)

Busiest domestic routes (2019)

Accidents and incidents
22 December 1962: a Varig Convair CV-240-2 registration PP-VCQ flying from Belo Horizonte-Pampulha to Brasília descended below the prescribed altitude while on final approach to Brasília, struck trees, skidded and fell to one side. One crew member died.
25 April 1970: a VASP Boeing 737-2A1 in route from Brasília to Manaus-Ponta Pelada was hijacked by a person who demanded to be flown to Cuba. The hijack lasted a day.
14 May 1970: a VASP Boeing 737-2A1 in route from Brasília to Manaus-Ponta Pelada was hijacked by a person who demanded to be flown to Cuba. Duration was one day.
22 February 1975: a VASP Boeing 737-2A1 registration PP-SMU in route from Goiânia to Brasília was hijacked by a person who demanded ransom. The hijacker was taken down.
25 May 1982: a VASP Boeing 737-2A1 registration PP-SMY made a hard landing with nose gear first at Brasília during rainy weather. The gear collapsed and the aircraft skidded off the runway breaking in two. Two passengers out of 118 occupants died.

Access
Regular buses, numbers 102 and 102.1, are frequent and link the airport to the main bus terminal at Rodoviária, from where travelers can catch buses or the subway to other parts of the city. The airport is also served by taxis.

See also
List of airports in Brazil
Brasília Air Force Base

References

External links

Documentary about Brasília International Airport
SIBS - Industrial Area close to Brasilia's Int'l Airport

Airports in Federal District (Brazil)
Airports established in 1957
Transport in Brasília